Emmanuel Kwame Keyekeh (born 21 December 1997) is a Ghanaian professional footballer who plays as midfielder for Ghana Premier League side Asante Kotoko S.C. He previously played for Unistar Academy and Karela United.

Club career

Early career 
Keyekeh started his career with Ghana Division One League side Unistar Academy and played there for 5 years before securing a move to Nzema-based club Karela United.

Karela United 
Keyekeh signed a three-year deal with Karela United in December 2017. He made his debut in the Ghana Premier League on 25 March 2018 in a 1–1 draw against Eleven Wonders FC, coming on in the 66th minute for Jean Vital Ourega. He later went on to make 9 league appearances in the 2018 Ghanaian Premier League, before the league was cancelled due to the dissolution of the GFA in June 2018, as a result of the Anas Number 12 Expose. During the 2019 GFA Normalization Committee Special Competition, he became a key member squad and featured in all 14 league matches to help Karela place second behind Hearts of Oak in group B.  At the end of the competition, there were reports that Nigerian club Enyimba FC and Ghanaian club Kumasi Asante Kotoko had shown interest in signing him but no deals were reached with either clubs. He however went on to play 11 league matches and was adjudged the man of the match three times in 2019–20 Ghana Premier League before the league was put on hold and later cancelled due to the COVID-19 pandemic.

Asante Kotoko 
In early September 2020, there were reports that Asante Kotoko had signed Keyekeh. He was also linked to other top Ghanaian teams Hearts of Oak, Aduana Stars and Legon Cities FC. On 30 September 2020, Asante Kotoko announced that they had signed him to bolster Maxwell Konadu's squad ahead of their CAF Champions League campaign and the 2020–21 Ghana Premier League. He signed a 3-year deal after successful negotiations and completing his mandatory medical examination. He featured for the club in their 2020–21 CAF Champions League campaign. On 29 November 2020, he played 45 minutes of a 1–1 draw against FC Nouadhibou before being substituted for Sulley Muniru at half-time. He made his league debut on the 15 November 2020 in a 1–1 draw against Eleven Wonders FC, he came on in the 84th minute for Ibrahim Osman to make a cameo appearance.

Style of play 
Keyekeh operates as a central midfielder and a defensive midfielder. Due to his role as a box-to-box midfielder he has been compared to Michael Essien and Yaya Toure. Based on his role as a midfielder Keyekeh idolises the African duo along with Kevin De Bruyne, Paul Pogba and Sulley Muntari. He sees them as his role models and draws inspirations and tips from them to improve his game. As a box-to-box midfielder he has the ability to exert energy in supporting both offensive and defensive play. His physicality during a match is shown in his powerful and tough tackling playing style.

References

External links 

 
 
 

Living people
1997 births
Association football midfielders
Ghanaian footballers
Karela United FC players
Asante Kotoko S.C. players
People from Tamale, Ghana